Ossama Mohammed (born 21 March 1954) is a Syrian film director and screenwriter. His film, The Box of Life, was screened in the Un Certain Regard section at the 2002 Cannes Film Festival.

He is currently living in exile in Paris, where he collaborated on Silvered Water, Syria Self-Portrait.

Filmography
 Khutwa Khutwa (Step by Step) (1978)
 Stars in Broad Daylight (1988)
 Al-Lail (Screenwriter) (1992)
 The Box of Life (2002)
 Silvered Water, Syria Self-Portrait (2014)

References

External links

1954 births
Living people
Syrian film directors
Syrian screenwriters
People from Latakia
Syrian exiles